Geedam is a census town and tehsil in Dantewada district in the state of Chhattisgarh, India. It is situated in National highway number 63 (previously numbered as national highway 16) about 75 km from Jagdalpur. It is a town between the Bijapur-Jagdalpur NH63 route. About 15 km away from Dantewara City. It has a railway station about 3 km from the proper town and a helipad just 1km away from the town. Bus connectivity for Raipur (State Capital), Jagdalpur City, Vishakapatnam City, Hyderabad City, Dantewara, Bijapur, Sukma, Bhopalpatnam, Barsoor and Kirandul is available.

Geography

Educational Institutions
Govt Higher Secondary School, Geedam, Dantewada
Aastha Vidya Mandir School, Edu City,  Geedam
DAV MM Public School, Edu City,  Geedam
NMDC DAV Polytechnic College,  Geedam
SAKSHAM School Geedam 
Eklavya School,  Geedam
ITI, Geedam 
Kanya Shala School, Edu City, Geedam 
Saraswati Shishu Mandir,  Geedam 
Gayatri Vidyapeeth,  Geedam 
Nirmal Kids School, Haram, Geedam 
Kasturba Gandhi girls school, Edu City, Geedam.

Demographics
 India census, Geedam had a population of 7,440. Males constitute 50% of the population and females 50%. Geedam has an average literacy rate of 65%, higher than the national average of 59.5%: male literacy is 74%, and female literacy is 56%. In Geedam, 14% of the population is under 6 years of age.People follow different religions like Hinduism, Jainism, Christianity, Islam and Sikhism.  Mostly people are Hindus (45-55%), followed by Jainism (15-20%), then Islam (5-10%),  and Christians (3-5%) and others. This town also have an Education City with more than 10 Educational Institutions and Hostels. Most of the Schools and Colleges provide free quality education.

Economy
Geedam is one of an important local market place for forest products. Tribal living in nearby jungle and villages bring forest products like mahua (used for making country beer), tora (used for making fuel oil), chironji, silk insect, dried mangoes. Tribals sell these things to local vendors. These markets are not only place for selling and buying forest products but also for green vegetable, fruits, local beer, clothes, fish and meat. Most of the vegetables sold in the market is locally grown. Mostly the population is earning through business and shop keeping. Weekly market on Sundays become a spot for this business and earning. Most of the people are selling vegetables and fruits in this market and also desi chicken is sold in this market.

References

Cities and towns in Dantewada district